Psychic School Wars, known as  in Japan, is a 1973 science fiction novel by Taku Mayumura. It has been adapted into four television dramas – in 1977, 1982, 1987, and 1997. Two live-action films were produced in 1981 and 1997. A 2012 anime film directed by Ryosuke Nakamura was produced by Sunrise and received comparisons to the works of Makoto Shinkai.

Characters

Main characters

, Takuto Yoshinaga (young) (Japanese), Graham Halstead, Amy Palant (young) (English)
Kenji is a seemingly average boy who lives with his grandfather and baby sister. His constant tardiness suggests he is lazy and his habits suggest he is absent minded, but his room is littered with inventions and construction plans, which indicates his appearance belies his intelligence. He and Natsuki have lived as neighbors since they were young children and are good friends despite their frequent fighting and incessant teasing. Kenji has an unexplained crush on Kahori Harukawa, which Natsuki exploits through teasing. Though Kenji is generally straightforward, he has difficulty putting his emotions into words, which makes it difficult for him to convey his feelings to Kahori and understand Natsuki's jealousy. Unknown to even him, Kenji is a powerful psychic whose powers were sealed by his grandfather.

Natsuki is an athletic girl who is devoted to running track. Her vivacious nature is demonstrated through her gymnastic movements. She and Kenji have lived next to one another since they were young children and are good friends. Natsuki has held a one-sided love for Kenji and is often confused by her own feelings. On the one hand, she wishes to support Kenji, but on the other, she wishes her feelings would reach him. As a result, she often says and does things to Kenji she does not mean. At some point, Kenji was in a life threatening coma and she traded her psychic powers for his safe recovery, which leaves her powerless.

 (Japanese); Alyson Leigh Rosenfeld (English)
Kahori is an outwardly perfect girl. She is dedicated to practicing the piano and surfs because it reminds her of her deceased father. She falls in love with Ryōichi from the moment she lays eyes on him and after listening to Ryōichi play Clair de Lune wants to become closer to him. Despite her good relationship with Kenji, she is unaware that he has a crush on her. She is friends with Natsuki, who frequently asks if she likes anyone. Kahori lacks psychic powers.

 (Japanese); Daniel J. Edwards (English)
Ryōichi is an ostensible transfer student who actually is a time traveler from a future where humanity has abandoned Earth to live on the moon. Ryōichi is calm, collected, and pragmatic. He has ample charisma and is well-liked by the student body following his transfer. He is taken by the beauty of the Earth and finds it easy to empathize with the people living there. He views Kenji as both a friend and an enemy with which he will eventually fight. As time progresses he falls in love with Kahori. He possesses the ability to awaken individuals psychic powers.

Others

References

External links
 Anime film official website 
 
 

1973 novels
2012 anime films
Films based on children's books
Films based on Japanese novels
Funimation
Kadokawa Shoten manga
Kodansha books
Novels set in Japan
Seinen manga
Shochiku films
Sunrise (company)